Saleh Ould Hanenna (born 1965 or 1966) is a former Mauritanian soldier and political figure.

Ould Hanenna served in the Mauritanian Army and rose to the rank of Major before being dismissed in 2000. In June 2003, he led an attempted coup, aiming to overthrow President Maaouya Ould Taya. He commanded a rebel section of the Army during two days of heavy fighting in Nouakchott which caused the death of dozens of people. With the failure of the coup Hanenna initially escaped capture, and formed a group called the Knights of Change with Mohamed Ould Cheikhna, but he was arrested on October 9, 2004.

The Government of Mauritania accused Ould Hanenna of attempting to organise coups on two further occasions, in August and September 2004, with the alleged backing of Libya and Burkina Faso. A death sentence was recommended at his subsequent trial, but he was instead given life imprisonment at the conclusion of the trial on February 3, 2005.

In August 2005, Ely Ould Mohamed Vall led a successful coup in the country that ousted President Ould Taya. The Military Council for Justice and Democracy which subsequently took charge of the government released Hanenna in an amnesty in early September.

On January 9, 2007, Hanenna, the president of the Mauritanian Union for Change (HATEM), was unanimously chosen by that party's executive committee as its candidate in the March 2007 presidential election. He took sixth position in the poll, with 7.65% of the votes cast, and subsequently backed Ahmed Ould Daddah for the second round.

Hanenna served as President of the Coordination of Democratic Opposition, a political coalition made up of parties opposed to Ould Abdel Aziz led government in Mauritania.

References

1965 births
Living people
Attempted coups d'état in Mauritania
Conflicts in 2003
Mauritanian military personnel
Mauritanian prisoners sentenced to life imprisonment
Prisoners sentenced to life imprisonment by Mauritania
Mauritanian Party of Union and Change politicians